The 2023 Monterey Bay FC season is the club's second season since their establishment on February 1, 2021.

Background 
The Union finished their first ever season twelfth place in the Western Conference of the USL Championship, seven points away from the final playoff spot. The team also suffered an upset in their US Open Cup debut, losing against the 3rd division side Bay Cities FC. 

In preparation for their second season, Monterey Bay brought back 17 players from their inaugural squad.

Season squad

Transfers

In

Out

Competitions

Friendlies

USL Championship

Western Conference

Results by round

Matches

U.S. Open Cup 

Monterey Bay FC will enter into the tournament in the 2nd Round.

References 

Monterey Bay FC
Monterey Bay FC
Monterey Bay FC